Hipp–Kennedy House is a historic home located at Penfield in Monroe County, New York. The main body of the house was built in 1838 and is in the Greek Revival style.  The frame building is composed of a two-story, three-bay main block with center entrance flanked by identical -story wings.  The north wing of the residence is believed to incorporate the remnants of a log dwelling built about 1804.

It was designated as a Penfield landmark in 1982  and was listed on the National Register of Historic Places in 1994.

References

Houses on the National Register of Historic Places in New York (state)
Greek Revival houses in New York (state)
Houses completed in 1838
Houses in Monroe County, New York
National Register of Historic Places in Monroe County, New York